Poliopastea esmeralda is a moth of the family Erebidae. It was described by Arthur Gardiner Butler in 1876. It is found in Panama and Tefé, Brazil.

References

Poliopastea
Moths described in 1876